Silvia Poloto is an artist born in São Paulo, Brazil who immigrated to San Francisco, California, in 1992. She earned a B.S. in electrical engineering from University of São Paulo. She earned her M.B.A. at the Fundação Getúlio Vargas (Getulio Vargas Foundation) in São Paulo. From 1996 to 1999, she worked as an instructor's assistant in the Sculpture Department, City College of San Francisco. During that period, she also worked as a welder at 3D Studios in Oakland and art instructor in mixed media at the Associated Students of the University of California Art Studio at the University of California, Berkeley.

She works in a variety of media, including photography, sculpture, and painting, and she also creates video art. Her work has been exhibited throughout the United States and abroad, including the United Arab Emirates, France, Spain, Italy, Singapore, Romania, Bulgaria, Greece, and China, among others. In the San Francisco Bay Area, her work has been featured in exhibitions at the Yerba Buena Center for the Arts, the SFMOMA Artist's Gallery, the Triton Museum of Art in Santa Clara, the Italian American Museum, and the M. H. de Young Memorial Museum, where she was an artist-in-residence in 2001. Poloto's work has been acquired by more than 50 institutional and corporate collections around the US and by more than 800 private collectors around the world.

Selected solo and group exhibitions

2018 

 Aberson Exhibits, Tulsa, OK ( solo )
 SFMOMA Artists Gallery, San Francisco, CA ( solo )
 Sanchez Art Center, Pacifica, CA ( two-person )
 stARTup Art Fair, San Francisco, CA
 DZINE, San Francisco, CA
 AAF via Dialecto Gallery, New York City, NY
 Desta Gallery, San Anselmo, CA

2017 

 Modernism at Foreign Cinema, San Francisco, CA ( solo )
 Arc Gallery, San Francisco, CA
 stARTup Art Fair, San Francisco, CA
 DZINE, San Francisco, CA

2016 

 SFMOMA Artist’s Gallery at Fort Mason, San Francisco, CA ( two-person )
 Butters Gallery, Portland, OR ( solo )
 JCO Fine Art, Los Gatos, CA ( solo )
 Slate Contemporary, Oakland, CA
 Scope New York, Dialecto Gallery, New York, NY
 stARTup Art Fair, San Francisco, CA
 DZINE, San Francisco, CA

2015 

 Slate Contemporary, Oakland, CA
 ArtMrktSF, SFMOMA Artist’s Gallery, San Francisco, CA
 stARTup Art Fair, San Francisco, CA
 AAF Hong Kong, Dialecto Gallery, Hong Kong, China
 AAF New York, Dialecto Gallery, New York, NY
 Art Taipei, Dialecto Gallery, Taipei, Taiwan
 Scope Miami, Dialecto gallery, Miami, FL
 The Billboard Creative, Los Angeles, CA

2014 

 Butters Gallery, Portland, OR ( solo )
 Aberson Exhibits, Tulsa, OK ( solo )
 Slate Contemporary, Oakland, CA

2013 

 SFMOMA Artist’s Gallery at Fort Mason, San Francisco, CA ( two-person )

2012 

 Triton Museum of Art, Santa Clara, CA ( solo )
 Julie Nester Gallery, Park City, UT ( solo )
 Butters Gallery, Portland, OR ( solo )
 5 Claude, San Francisco, CA ( solo )
 McLoughlin Gallery, San Francisco, CA ( solo )
 SFMOMA Artist's Gallery, San Francisco, CA
 Soprafina Gallery, Chicago, MA
 Artamo Gallery, Santa Barbara, CA
 A New Leaf Gallery, Sonoma, CA
 Maiden Tower, Baku, Azerbaijan
 Artspace 191, Vienna, Austria
 Ruzicka Gallery, Munich, Germany

2011 

 Lecture/Solo Exhibition at Spokane Falls Community College, Spokane, WA (solo)
 Bryant Street Gallery, Palo Alto, CA ( solo )
 Caffe Museo at San Francisco Museum of Modern Art, San Francisco, CA ( solo )
 Aberson Exhibits, Tulsa, OK ( solo )
 Qatar Visual Art Center, Doha, Qatar
 Aberson Exhibits, Tulsa, OK
 Julie Nester Gallery, Park City, UT

2010 

 Butters Gallery, Portland, OR ( solo )
 Julie Nester Gallery, Park City, UT
 Zervas Art Gallery, Patras, Greece
 Arc Art Gallery, San Francisco, CA
 AAF NYC, Julie Nester Gallery, New York City, NY

2009 

 Foresight Gallery, Amman, Jordan
 AAF NYC Julie Nester Gallery, New York City, NY
 AAF NYC Cancio Contemporary, New York City, NY
 Brazilian Embassy, San Francisco, CA
 Gozo Contemporary, Gozo, Malta

2008 

 415 Gallery, San Francisco, CA ( solo )
 Dezart One Gallery, Palm Springs, CA ( solo )
 Limn Gallery, San Francisco, CA
 Seattle Arts Museum Gallery, Seattle, WA
 Ogilvie Pertl Gallery, Chicago, IL
 Mexican Embassy, San Francisco, CA
 Mission Cultural Center, San Francisco, CA
 Dar Al Landa Gallery, Amman, Jordan
 Trogir Municipal Museum and Palace Milesi, Split, Croatia

2007
 Connecting Art Gallery Ptolemaida, Greece
Julie Nester Gallery, Park City, UT
International Exhibition, Cappadocia, Turkey
AAF NYC Julie Nester Gallery, New York City, NY
AAF NYC Cancio Contemporary, New York City, NY
Summer Introductions at Seattle Arts Museum Gallery, Seattle, WA
 East/West at Etra Fine Arts, Miami, FL (two-person)
 Silvia Poloto Solo at Fairmount Gallery, TX (solo)
 Introduction Show at Butters Gallery, Portland, OR

2006
 Optic Collisons at Museo Italo Americano, San Francisco, California (solo)
 Paprika: paintings, assemblages and submarine vessels at Spur Projects, Portola Valley, CA (solo)
 Connecting Cultures at the United Nations, New York City, NY
 Crush, at Toomey-Tourell Gallery, San Francisco, CA (two-person)
 8th International Art Symposim of Modern Art and Exhibition, Carei, Romania
 FlowArt Fair at Miami Art Basel, Miami, FL
 Group Show at Espace Europia, Paris, France
 Dialogue – Connecting Art at Vlassis Gallery, Greece
 Red Sky – Connecting Art at Galerie 13 bis Contemporain, Saint Pierre, La Reunion

2005
 Bulgaria International Art Symposium and Exhibition, Russalka, Bulgaria
 Hong Kong International Biennial, Hong Kong, Republic of China
 Genie de La Bastille Invitational, Paris, France
 La Muestra International de Arte, Venado Tuerto, Argentina
 Women's Work Now, 555 California St, San Francisco, CA
 Observations, 1212 Gallery, Burlingame, CA (solo)
 SPUR Salon, Woodside, CA (solo)

2004
 Dubai International Art Symposium and Exhibition, Dubai, UAE
 Hearts in San Francisco Installation Project, San Francisco, CA
 Unresolved: Poloto in Soho, sponsored by SPUR, New York City, NY (solo)
 New Work, Stanford University, Betchel International Center, Stanford, CA
 Julie Nester Gallery, Park City, UT
 1212 Gallery, Burlingame, CA
 Sanchez Art Center, Pacifica, CA
 BIG: Group Show curated by Toomey-Tourell Gallery, San Francisco, CA
 Gallery 494, Palo Alto, CA (solo)
 Mission Cultural Center, San Francisco, CA

2003
 Steel Gallery, San Francisco, CA
 International Biennial of Contemporary Art, Florence, Italy
 Gallery 555 – Oakland Museum of California, Oakland, CA
 HANG Gallery, San Francisco, CA (solo)
 Contract Design Center, San Francisco, CA

2002
 Vorpal Gallery, San Francisco, CA
 Gallery img, Sunnyvale, CA ( solo)

2001
 California Palace of the Legion of Honor Residency Program, San Francisco, CA (solo)

2000
 Yerba Buena Center for the Arts, San Francisco, CA
 Berkeley Art Center, Berkeley, CA

1999
 Richmond Art Center, Richmond, CA (solo)

See also
 List of Brazilian artists
 Contemporary art

References

External links
 Silvia Poloto official website

Year of birth missing (living people)
Living people
Brazilian photographers
Brazilian emigrants to the United States